In algebra, a differential graded module, or dg-module, is a -graded module together with a differential; i.e., a square-zero graded endomorphism of the module of degree 1 or −1, depending on the convention. In other words, it is a chain complex having a structure of a module, while a differential graded algebra is a chain complex with a structure of an algebra.

The Dold–Kan correspondence 
Given a commutative ring R, by definition, the category of simplicial modules are simplicial objects in the category of R-modules; denoted by sModR. Then sModR can be identified with the category of differential graded modules which vanish in negative degrees via the Dold-Kan correspondence.

See also 
Differential graded Lie algebra

References 

Henri Cartan, Samuel Eilenberg, Homological algebra
  Available online.

Algebra